Bone Brothers 2 is an album the record label put out. It’s a mix of old verses from Bizzy Bone and Layzie Bone. It was released via Real Talk Entertainment on May 8, 2007, the same day as Bone Thugs-n-Harmony's Strength & Loyalty. Recording sessions took place at the White House with Black Trim. Production was handled by Big Hollis, Vince V., Preach and Derrick "Sac" Johnson, who also served as executive producer. The album debuted at number 122 on the U.S. Billboard 200 chart, selling over 7,000 units during its first week. Albums purchased at Best Buy include three bonus Bizzy Bone tracks.

Track listing

Personnel
Bryon "Bizzy Bone" McCane – main artist
Steven "Layzie Bone" Howse – main artist
Walter Hollis – producer (tracks: 1, 4, 5, 7, 8, 11, 13, 14), engineering, mixing
Vince V. – producer (tracks: 2, 3, 10, 12)
Preach – producer (tracks: 4, 5)
Derrick "Sac" Johnson – producer (tracks: 6, 9), executive producer
Black Trim – recording
Ken Lee – mastering

Charts

References

External links

2007 albums
Bone Brothers albums
Albums produced by Big Hollis
Real Talk Entertainment albums